Santa Ignacia, is named after the founder of the Religious of the Virgin Mary Order, the Venerable Mother Ignacia del Espiritu Santo, officially the Municipality of Santa Ignacia, is a 2nd class municipality in the province of Tarlac, Philippines. It is composed of 24 barangays two of which (Poblacion East and Poblacion West) are located in the urban area while the rest of 22 barangays are located in the rural areas. According to the 2020 census, it has a population of 51,626 people.

Geography

Barangays
Santa Ignacia is politically subdivided into 24 barangays.

 Baldios
 Botbotones 
 Caanamongan 
 Cabaruan 
 Cabugbugan 
 Caduldulaoan 
 Calipayan 
 Macaguing 
 Nambalan
 Padapada 
 Pilpila 
 Pinpinas 
 Poblacion East 
 Poblacion West 
 Pugo-Cecilio 
 San Francisco
 San Sotero 
 San Vicente 
 Santa Ines Centro 
 Santa Ines East 
 Santa Ines West 
 Taguiporo
 Timmaguab 
 Vargas

Climate

Demographics

Economy

Gallery

References

External links

 Santa Ignacia Profile at PhilAtlas.com
 
 Town History
 [ Philippine Standard Geographic Code]
Philippine Census Information

Municipalities of Tarlac